Hans Bässler (born 11 February 1934) is a Swiss fencer. He competed in the team épée event at the 1960 Summer Olympics.

References

External links
 

1934 births
Living people
Swiss male fencers
Olympic fencers of Switzerland
Fencers at the 1960 Summer Olympics
Sportspeople from Basel-Stadt